Oke or OKE may refer to:

 Ōke, branches of the Japanese Imperial Family
 Oka (mass), an Ottoman measure of mass
 OKE (mixtape), a 2013 mixtape by rapper Game
 Oke (name)
 Oke, Alberta, a locality in Yellowhead County, Alberta, Canada
 Okinoerabu Airport, Kagoshima Prefecture, Japan (IATA airport code: OKE)
Okehampton railway station, England (station code OKE)
 Okpe language (Southwestern Edo), an Edoid language of Nigeria (ISO 639-3 code: oke)
 Oke or oké, variations of okay